Shelley Marshaun Massenburg-Smith (born August 3, 1988), known professionally as DRAM (an abbreviation for "does real-ass music", formerly Shelley FKA DRAM), is an American rapper, singer, and record producer from Hampton, Virginia. He is signed to Atlantic Records and Empire Distribution. His debut single was "Cha Cha", followed by his breakout single "Broccoli" (featuring Lil Yachty), which peaked at number five on the US Billboard Hot 100. In October 2016, he released his debut studio album Big Baby DRAM.

Early life
Massenburg-Smith was born in Landstuhl, West Germany. Before the age of one, he moved to the United States and was raised in Hampton, Virginia. His mother was in the military. As a teenager, Massenburg-Smith was an ardent fan of the singer Bilal and recalls discovering his unreleased second album Love for Sale when it leaked online in 2006, later citing the song "White Turns to Grey" as his favorite "hidden gem" in music.

Career
In March 2015, DRAM released his debut EP, #1Epic through Atlantic Records and Empire Distribution. The EP included the single "Cha Cha", which peaked at number one on the Bubbling Under Hot R&B/Hip-Hop Singles chart. In October 2015, his debut mixtape, Gahdamn! was released.

In April 2016, DRAM released his hit single "Broccoli" featuring Lil Yachty. The song gained international success and peaked at number five on the Billboard Hot 100, becoming his first top five song in the country. In October 2016, he appeared on The Tonight Show Starring Jimmy Fallon, performing "Blessings (Reprise)" with Chance the Rapper, Ty Dolla Sign, Anthony Hamilton and Raury. His debut studio album, Big Baby DRAM, was released on October 21, 2016. The album received many positive reviews.

DRAM was featured on the single "Andromeda" from British virtual band Gorillaz for their fifth album, Humanz. He also provided uncredited guest vocals on the track "We Got the Power" from the same album.

He voices Wallace from Lazor Wulf.

Discography

Studio albums

Extended plays

Mixtapes

Singles

As lead artist

As featured artist

Other charted songs

Guest appearances

Awards and nominations

Notes

References

External links
 DRAM on SoundCloud 
 DRAM on YouTube

1988 births
Living people
African-American male rappers
American male rappers
People from Neustadt an der Weinstraße
20th-century African-American people
Musicians from Hampton, Virginia
21st-century American rappers
21st-century American male musicians
Atlantic Records artists
21st-century African-American musicians
Southern hip hop musicians
American contemporary R&B singers